Radim Jančura (born 12 January 1972 in Ostrava) is a Czech businessman. He is the founder, sole owner and managing director of Student Agency and a board member of its subsidiary RegioJet.

In the early 1990s Radim Jančura graduated from Brno University of Technology and was also an exchange student in London. After two months he returned to Brno and set up an au pair agency (Student Agency) working with British agencies to send Czechs and Slovaks to Britain. Student Agency is one of the most popular transport companies in the Czech Republic today.

Jančura was named Czech Entrepreneur of the Year in 2005 by Ernst and Young.

References

External links 
 Radim Jančura – Founder and head of Student Agency, Radio.cz
 Radim Jančura – Man who found a passage to profit, Financial Times
 Businessman launches campaign against ČSSD , PragueMonitor.com
 Czech Business Weekly

1972 births
Living people
People from Ostrava
Czech businesspeople
Brno University of Technology alumni